Margarete Selling is a retired East German rower who won the 1966 European Championships in the eight event. She married the judoka Herbert Niemann (1935–1991).

References

Year of birth missing (living people)
Living people
East German female rowers
European Rowing Championships medalists